Erna Visk (4 May 1910 – 20 April 1983) was an Estonian and Soviet politician. 

Erna Visk was born in Pärnu. Her father was Workers' United Front politician Jüri Visk, who served in the II Riigikogu. 

She was appointed Minister of Social Security of the Estonian SSR in 1958. Visk also served in the III Supreme Soviet of the Estonian Soviet Socialist Republic and the IV Supreme Council of the Estonian SSR.

She was buried in Tallinn's Forest Cemetery.

References

1910 births
1983 deaths
Politicians from Pärnu
20th-century Estonian women politicians
20th-century Estonian politicians
Government ministers of Estonia
Soviet women in politics
Estonian communists
Women government ministers of Estonia
Members of the Supreme Soviet of the Estonian Soviet Socialist Republic, 1951–1955
Burials at Metsakalmistu